Suzanne Steele is a Métis poet and academic. Suzanne Steele worked as an Official Canadian War Artist in Afghanistan between 2008 and 2010.  In 2017, Suzanne Steele, in partnership with Jeff Ryan, premiered their symphonic/choral work entitled Afghanistan: Requiem for a Generation.

Dr. Steele gained an undergraduate degree in music from the University of British Columbia, a Master of Library and Information Science from the University of Western Ontario in 1991 and her PhD from the University of Exeter in 2017. Her PhD thesis was entitled "The Art of Witness: Truth, Process, and Form in the Work of Robert Graves, Mary Borden, and David Jones".

References 

Year of birth missing (living people)
Living people
Métis writers
Métis academics
University of British Columbia alumni
University of Western Ontario alumni
Alumni of the University of Exeter